S12 may refer to:

Aviation 
 Albany Municipal Airport (Oregon), in Linn County, Oregon, United States
 Letov Š-12, a Czechoslovakian prototype fighter aircraft
 Rans S-12 Airaile, an American civil utility aircraft
 SABCA S.XII, a Belgian passenger aircraft
 SIAI S.12, an Italian flying-boat
 Sikorsky S-12, a Russian trainer aircraft
 SPAD S.XII, a French biplane fighter
 Spencer S-12 Air Car, an American amphibious aircraft
 Stemme S12, a German motor glider

Rail and transit

Lines 
 S12 (Rhine-Ruhr S-Bahn), Germany
 S12 (St. Gallen S-Bahn), Switzerland
 S12 (ZVV), Zürich, Switzerland
 Line S12 (Milan suburban railway service), Italy

Locomotives 
 Baldwin S-12, a diesel-electric locomotive
 Sri Lanka Railways S12, a diesel multiple unit

Stations 
 Asari Station (Hokkaido), in Otaru, Hokkaido, Japan
 Bang Wa station, in Bangkok, Thailand
 Iyo-Nagahama Station, in Ōzu, Ehime Prefecture, Japan
 Kikukawa Station, in Sumida, Tokyo, Japan
 Mizuho Kuyakusho Station, in Mizuho-ku, Nagoya, Aichi Prefecture, Japan
 Myōdani Station, in Suma-ku, Kobe, Hyōgo Prefecture, Japan

Roads 
 Airport Expressway (Beijing), China
 Shanghai–Jiaxing–Huzhou Expressway, China
 S12 highway (Georgia)
 Expressway S12 (Poland)
 County Route S12 (California), United States

Vessels 
 , in service 1963–1972
 , in service 1972–1993
 , an armed yacht of the Royal Canadian Navy
 , a submarine of the Royal Navy
 , a submarine of the United States Navy

Other uses 
 S12 (classification), a disability swimming classification
 40S ribosomal protein S12
 British NVC community S12, a swamps and tall-herb fens community in the British National Vegetation Classification system
 Lenovo IdeaPad S12, a laptop
 Nissan Silvia (S12), a sports car
 S12: Do not keep the container sealed, a safety phrase
 Saiga-12, a Russian semi-automatic shotgun
 S12, a postcode district in Sheffield, England